Prioria platycarpa is a species of plant in the family Fabaceae. It is found only in Fiji.

References

Detarioideae
Endemic flora of Fiji
Least concern plants